Two years after the closure of the original University of Chicago campus in Bronzeville (1857–1886), supporters succeeded in raising money for a new location. The new campus opened its doors in 1890, after the original legal entity of the university was renamed "The Old University of Chicago." Established by oil magnate John D. Rockefeller, prominent figures from the Bronzeville campus, and the American Baptist Education Society, the new campus was built upon the intellectual, social, and financial legacy of the original institution. William Rainey Harper became the President of the University of Chicago in 1891 and its first classes were held in 1892. It has been coeducational since its establishment.

Major educational reforms were instituted during the tenure of the University's fifth president Robert Maynard Hutchins during the Great Depression and World War II, including the creation of the University's Common Core curriculum.

Recently, the University has begun major campus expansion projects.

Founding

The University of Chicago was founded by a small group of Baptist educators in 1856 through a land endowment by Senator Stephen A. Douglas. Disparagingly called "Douglas College" by its detractors, the University of Chicago's original ten-acre campus was on the northwest corner of 35th Street and Cottage Grove Avenue, a neighborhood now known as Bronzeville. Local Baptist congregations secured donations to help partially finance construction of the elaborate Gothic-style building, named Douglas Hall, in 1857, with loans collateralized against the Douglas land used to secure the balance. 

From the moment of its founding the school was marred in controversy due to Senator Douglas's support of slavery and his authorship of the Kansas–Nebraska Act. Early fundraising efforts were further hampered as Douglas came under heavy fire during the run-up to the 1860 presidential election for his ownership of 123 slaves and a 3000-acre cotton plantation in Lawrence County, Mississippi. In response, trustees further encumbered the land to fund the university's operations while funneling cash donations to a separate account for what is today the University of Chicago Divinity School (which temporarily moved to a separate campus in Morgan Park before rejoining the larger university in its current location in Hyde Park location in 1891).  
The current quarter system practiced at the University of Chicago was an innovation that began at the Bronzeville campus and continues uninterrupted to this day.  Alumni from the pre-1890 Bronzville campus are recognized as alumni of the University of Chicago today while more than half of the university's post-1890 trustees and donors (including its largest donor John D. Rockefeller) had a relationship to the University of Chicago prior to 1890. The university's current mascot of a Phoenix rising from the ashes is a reference to the fire, foreclosure, and demolition of the original Bronzeville campus with the current Hyde Park campus emerging triumphantly in its place. As an homage to this pre-1890 legacy a single stone from the rubble of the original Douglas Hall in Bronzeville was brought to the current Hyde Park location and set into the wall of the Classics Building. To honor Stephen A. Douglas, a bronze bust of the university's founding donor was placed in Hutchinson Commons which is today the main dining hall and student center on campus. All told these connections have led the Dean of the College and University of Chicago and Professor of History John Boyer to conclude that the University of Chicago has a "plausible genealogy as a pre– Civil War institution".

The University of Chicago's Hyde Park campus began in 1890 through the efforts of the American Baptist Education Society and oil magnate John D. Rockefeller, who later called it "the best investment I ever made." The University of Chicago held its first classes there on October 1, 1892. The original tract of land, comprising the current main quads, was donated by Marshall Field, owner of the Marshall Field and Company department store chain. The modern university emerged from a reorganization of the predecessor institution of the same name, later renamed as the Old University of Chicago. The earlier institution was founded by prominent members of the Chicago and greater Illinois community including Justice Stephen A. Douglas and Chicago Mayor James Hutchinson Woodworth. Graduates of the Old Chicago University were later assimilated into the ranks of the alumni of the University of Chicago.

The University's founding was part of a wave of university foundings that followed the American Civil War. Incorporated in 1890, the University has dated its founding as July 1, 1891, when William Rainey Harper became its first president. The first classes were held on October 1, 1892, with an enrollment of 594 students and a faculty of 120, including eight former college presidents. Earlier references to University of Chicago rise from the incorporation of the first University of Chicago, which Senator Stephen A. Douglas started with an 1856 grant.

Westward migration, population growth, and industrialization had led to an increasing need for elite schools away from the East Coast, especially schools that would focus on issues vital to national development. Though Rockefeller was urged to build in New England or the Mid-Atlantic region of the United States, he ultimately chose Chicago. His choice reflected his strong desire to realize Thomas Jefferson's dream of a natural meritocracy's rise to prominence, determined by talent rather than familial heritage. Rockefeller's early fiscal emphasis on the physics department showed his pragmatic, yet deeply intellectual, desires for the school.

The first president Harper, an accomplished scholar (Semiticist) and a member of the Baptist clergy, believed that a great university should maintain the study of faith as a central focus, to prepare students for careers in teaching and research and ministers for service to the church and community. As per this commitment, he brought the Morgan Park Seminary of the Baptist Theological Union to Hyde Park, and the Divinity School was founded in 1891 as the first professional school at the University of Chicago. And yet, although founded under Baptist auspices, the University of Chicago has never had a sectarian affiliation. The business school was founded thereafter in 1898, and the law school was founded in 1902. Harper died in 1906, and was replaced by a succession of three presidents whose tenures lasted until 1929. During this period, the Oriental Institute was founded to support and interpret archeological work in the Near East.

Unlike many other American universities at the time, the University of Chicago thus came to revolve around a number of graduate research institutions, following Germanic precedent. The College of the University of Chicago remained quite small compared to its East Coast peers until around the middle of the 20th century.

As a result, the graduate population of the university dwarfs the undergraduate population 2:1 to this day, while the university's undergraduate student body remains the third smallest amongst the top 10 national universities. The student-to-faculty ratio is 4:1, one of the lowest amongst national universities, and nearly all faculty members teach undergraduate courses.

The school's traditions of rigorous scholarship were established primarily by Presidents William Rainey Harper and Robert Maynard Hutchins. Chicago opened its door to women and minorities from the very beginning, a time when they seldom had access to other leading universities. It was the first major university to enroll women on an equal basis with men, as well as the first major, predominantly white university to offer a black professor a tenured position, in 1947.

Presidency of Robert Hutchins
During his presidency, Robert Maynard Hutchins met with the president of academic rival Northwestern University to discuss the future of the two institutions through the Depression and the looming war. Hutchins concluded that, in order to secure the future of both universities, it was in the best interest of both for the two campuses to merge as the "Universities of Chicago", with Northwestern's campus serving as the site for undergraduate education and the Hyde Park campus serving as the graduate studies campus. President Hutchins' vision for what he hoped would become the preeminent university in the world eventually faltered amidst opposition from several groups, most notably Northwestern's medical faculty. Hutchins called the episode "one of the lost opportunities of American education."

Starting in the 1930s, the university conducted a more successful experiment on the college. To make the university a preeminent undergraduate academic institution, administrators decided to implement President Hutchins' philosophy of secular perennialism. This led to the innovation of the common core, an educational strategy in which students read original source materials rather than textbooks, and discuss them in small groups using the Socratic method rather than a lecture approach. The common core is still an important feature of Chicago's undergraduate education. In addition to pioneering this new undergraduate curriculum, the university took steps to eliminate "distractions" such as varsity sports, fraternities, and religious organizations. This attracted free-thinkers such as Carl Sagan and Kurt Vonnegut to the university. The university succeeded in eliminating all varsity sports for 20 years and all but five fraternities, although three of the eliminated fraternities were re-chartered in the 1980s.

Science at Chicago
The University of Chicago made contributions to 20th century science. In 1909, Professor Robert Andrews Millikan performed the oil-drop experiment in the Ryerson Physical Laboratory on the university campus. This experiment allowed Millikan to calculate the charge of an electron and paved the way for the theory of quantum mechanics in the 1940s. The American Physical Society now designates Ryerson Laboratory a historic physics site.

As part of the Manhattan Project, University of Chicago chemists, led by Glenn T. Seaborg, began to study the newly manufactured radioactive element plutonium. The George Herbert Jones Laboratory was the site where, for the first time, a trace quantity of this new element was isolated and measured in September 1942. This procedure enabled chemists to determine the new element's atomic weight. Room 405 of the building was named a National Historic Landmark in May 1967.

On December 2, 1942, scientists achieved the world's first self-sustained nuclear reaction at a university athletic field known as Stagg Field under the direction of professor Enrico Fermi. A sculpture by Henry Moore marks the spot, now deemed a National Historic Landmark, where the nuclear reaction took place. The original Stagg Field has since been demolished to make way for the Regenstein Library.

Other scientific discoveries that have taken place at the University of Chicago include:
 The technique of radiocarbon dating, developed in 1949 by Willard Libby and his team during his tenure as a professor at the university. Libby was awarded the Nobel Prize in Chemistry in 1960 for this discovery.
 The discovery of the atmosphere's jet stream.
 The discovery of REM sleep.
 The discovery of synchronized menstrual cycles
 The famous Miller–Urey experiment, considered to be the classic experiment on the origin of life.
 The development of Agent Orange, a highly-toxic herbicide that would gain notoriety for its use during the Malayan Emergency and the Vietnam War.
 The prediction of white dwarfs and black holes by Subrahmanyan Chandrasekhar, who won the Nobel Prize in Physics in 1983.

Arts at Chicago

Although the University of Chicago is better known for its academic and scientific achievements, its students and faculty have also made significant contributions to the arts. In 1955, the University of Chicago became the birthplace of improvisational comedy with the formation of the undergraduate comedy troupe, the Compass Players. In 1959, alumnus Paul Sills, who many consider the father of improvisational theater, founded The Second City along with Bernard Sahlins, also a graduate of the University. Since its founding, The Second City Theater has inspired other comedy troupes such as Saturday Night Live, as well as serving as an incubator for artists such as Alan Arkin, Mike Nichols, Harold Ramis, Bill Murray, Mike Myers, Stephen Colbert, Tina Fey, Jack McBrayer, and Steve Carell.

In 1964, Professor Ralph Shapey founded the University of Chicago Contemporary Chamber Players, one of the oldest and most successful professional new music groups in the nation. The Contemporary Chamber Players, also known as "contempo", has given over eighty world premieres of established and emerging composers.

While teaching on the Committee on Social Thought, Professor Saul Bellow wrote several best-selling novels, including Herzog in 1964 and Humboldt's Gift in 1975, for which he was awarded the 1976 Pulitzer Prize for Fiction and Nobel Prize in Literature.

The University of Chicago also founded the Renaissance Society in 1915, which is devoted to the exhibition of contemporary art. The Society's 1934 exhibition of Alexander Calder's "mobiles" and its 1936 survey of paintings and drawings by Fernand Léger were the first solo exhibitions of these artists in the United States.

The Smart Museum was established in 1974 in association with the University of Chicago's Art History department. It was endowed by David A. Smart and his brother Alfred Smart. In 1983, the museum became a separate unit of the university devoted to serving the entire community, including educational outreach activities in local public schools. In 2000 it completed a $2 million renovation.

1950s–1980s
In the early 1950s, student applications declined as a result of increasing crime and poverty in the Hyde Park neighborhood. In response, the university became a major sponsor of a controversial urban renewal project for Hyde Park, which profoundly affected both the neighborhood's architecture and street plan. For details of this urban renewal effort, see Hyde Park.

The Spring 1958 edition of the university's literary journal the Chicago Review, edited by Irving Rosenthal and Paul Carroll, published excerpts from William S. Burroughs’ experimental novel Naked Lunch. The university was criticized for publishing fiction deemed obscene by a columnist in the Chicago Daily News and suppressed the Winter 1959 issue, which contained more material from the Naked Lunch manuscript. The university administration fired Rosenthal and Carroll, who regarded the university's attempt at suppressing Naked Lunch as censorship.

The University experienced its share of student unrest during the 1960s, beginning in 1962, when students occupied President George Beadle's office in a protest over the University's off-campus rental policies. In 1969, more than 400 students, angry about the dismissal of a popular professor, Marlene Dixon, occupied the Administration Building for two weeks. After the sit-in ended, when Dixon turned down a one-year reappointment, 42 students were expelled and 81 were suspended, the most severe response to student occupations of any American university during the student movement.

In 1978, Hanna Holborn Gray, then the provost of Yale University, became President of the University of Chicago, the first woman ever to serve as the full president of a major research university.

1990s–present

In 1990, the Consortium on Chicago School Research (CCSR) was created after the passage of the Chicago School Reform Act that decentralized governance of the city's public schools. Researchers at the University of Chicago joined with researchers from Chicago Public Schools and other organizations to form CCSR with the imperative to study this landmark restructuring and its long-term effects. Since then CCSR has undertaken research on many of Chicago's school reform efforts, some of which have been embraced by other cities as well. Thus, CCSR studies have also informed broader national movements in public education.

In 1999, then-President Hugo Sonnenschein announced plans to relax the university's famed core curriculum, reducing the number of required courses from 21 to 15. When The New York Times, The Economist, and other major news outlets picked up this story, the university became the focal point of a national debate on education. The changes were ultimately implemented, but the controversy led to President Sonnenschein's resignation in 2000.

In 2006, the University of Chicago's Oriental Institute became the center of controversy when U.S. federal courts ruled to seize and auction its valuable collection of ancient Persian artifacts, the proceeds of which would go to compensate the victims of a 1997 bombing in Jerusalem that the United States believes was funded by Iran. The ruling threatens the university's invaluable collection of ancient clay tablets held by the Oriental Institute since the 1930s but officially owned by Iran.

In 2007, the University of Chicago received a $35 million donation from David and Reva Logan to be used toward the construction of the Reva and David Logan Center for the Arts. The new arts center "will be a venue for the artistic expression and multidisciplinary inquiry, performance and production of our faculty and students", said President Robert Zimmer in his May 3 note. The building was constructed next to Midway Studios, which was the personal residence and studio for sculptor Lorado Taft. The University selected the firm of Tod Williams Billie Tsien Architects to design the center.

Later in 2007, the University of Chicago received a donation of $100 million from anonymous donor known only as "Homer". The donation will be used as the cornerstone of a $400 million undergraduate student aid initiative. Beginning in the fall of 2008, students became eligible for enhanced financial aid packages called Odyssey Scholarships, which aim to eliminate student loans entirely among students whose annual family income is less than $75,000 and to eliminate half the student loan packages among students whose annual family income is between $75,000 and $90,000. The College expected nearly a quarter of the entire College population to benefit from the program.

In 2008, the University of Chicago announced plans to establish the Milton Friedman Institute.  Friedman, a Nobel Laureate in economics, received his A.M. in economics from the university in 1933 and was a professor at the University of Chicago for over thirty years.  The institute will cost around $200 million and occupy the buildings of the Chicago Theological Seminary. Some faculty members and students signed petition against these plans. During the same year, investor David G. Booth donated $300 million to the University's Graduate School of Business, which is the largest gift in the University's history and the largest gift ever to any business school.

Also in 2008, the University of Chicago and particularly its surrounding neighborhood of Hyde Park attracted international media attention because of former Law School lecturer Barack Obama's election as President of the United States.

See also
 List of University of Chicago people

References

University of Chicago
Chicago
University of Chicago